Joé Descomps-Cormier (18 January 1869 – 24 April 1950) was a French sculptor. His work was part of the sculpture event in the art competition at the 1924 Summer Olympics.

References

1869 births
1950 deaths
19th-century French sculptors
20th-century French sculptors
French male sculptors
Olympic competitors in art competitions
Artists from Clermont-Ferrand
19th-century French male artists